Tutchone is an Athabaskan language spoken by the Northern and Southern Tutchone First Nations in central and southern regions of Yukon Territory, Canada. Tutchone belongs to the Northern Athabaskan linguistic subfamily and has two primary varieties, Southern and Northern. Although they are sometimes considered separate languages, Northern and Southern Tutchone speakers are generally able to understand each other in conversation, albeit with moderate difficulty.

Southern Tutchone is spoken in the Yukon communities of Aishihik, Burwash Landing, Champagne, Haines Junction, Kloo Lake, Klukshu, Lake Laberge, and Whitehorse.

Northern Tutchone is spoken in the Yukon communities of Mayo, Pelly Crossing, Stewart Crossing, Carmacks, and Beaver Creek.

Phonology

Northern Tutchone 
The consonants and vowels of Northern Tutchone and their orthography are as follows:

Consonants

Vowels

Vowels are differentiated for nasalization and high, mid, and low tone.

 Nasalized: į, ų, ę, ą̈, ǫ, ą
 High tone: í, ú, é, ä́ , ó, á
 Mid tone: ī, ū, ē, ǟ, ō, ā
 Low tone: unmarked

Southern Tutchone

Consonants

Vowels

Vowels are differentiated for nasalization and high, mid, and low tone.

 Nasalized: į, ų, ų̈, ę, ą̈, ǫ, ą
 High tone: í, ú, ǘ, é, ä́ , ó, á
 Mid tone: ī, ū, ǖ, ē, ǟ, ō, ā

Dialects 
Southern
 Aishihik dialect
 Tàaʼan dialect
 Klukshu dialect
 Kluane dialect
Northern
 Big Salmon dialect
 Pelly Crossing dialect
 Mayo dialect
 White River dialect

Vocabulary comparison
The comparison of some words in the two languages:

¹ Big Salmon dialect 
² Pelly Crossing dialect

Revitalization efforts 
Tutchone is considered to be an endangered language, as its speaker population is shifting rapidly to English. In a 2011 census, Northern Tutchone was reported to have 210 speakers, and Southern Tutchone 140 speakers.

Literacy and documentation

The Yukon Native Language Center (YNLC) describes information in regards to Southern Tutchone documentation and literacy, starting from the 1970s such as stories and songs, as well as a basic noun dictionary and language lessons. After 1984, there have been additional literacy workshops. One example is the Southern Tutchone textbook and audio, made by Margaret Workman, a native Southern Tutchone speaker. This information, along with other multimedia Southern Tutchone language learning and documentation resources, is currently available through the YNLC. In addition, in 1994 the Ta'an Kwach'an Council took part in an oral history and language preservation project, in which traditions, genealogy, and more information was documented.

Education

Tutchone language classes have been taught in Yukon schools since the early 1980s. Southern Tutchone language classes are included in the curriculum for students grades K-12 in schools at Kluane Lake, and three elementary schools in Whitehorse have language programs for Southern Tutchone. The St. Elias Community School in Haines Junction also offers Southern Tutchone language classes to students from K-12: one teacher handles K-4, another grades 5-12. In addition, the Yukon Native Language Center provides support for schools in regards to language learning, such the "Dakeyi – Our Country" program which is focused on high school students. In 2009, kindergarten classes in Haines Junction began learning Southern Tuchone in a bi-cultural program.

Community engagement

There have been ongoing community collaborations across the Yukon in regards to Southern Tutchone, with varied camps, workshops, and programs. For example, in 1995 and 1996, the Kluane First Nations participated in the sessions of "Working Together to Pass it on", a workshop meant to promote language activities and usage at home and the community. In addition, the Southern Tutchone Tribal Council held its first language conference "Kakwaddhin – Marking the Trail" in 1996, in order to review language programs and draft long and short term strategic plans. This led to successful programs, including the "Following your Grandfather trail" camp in Klukshu in 1997. Nowadays there are varied programs offered in the Yukon to continue the language revitalization efforts, such as the Southern Tutchone Language Immersion program for adults. In 2018, The Champagne and Aishihik First Nation began a two-year Southern Tutchone immersion program, for adults with prior knowledge to the language. The program is under development and is the first of its kind in the Yukon Territory.

In popular culture 
Jerry Alfred's "" (Grandfather song), sung in Northern Tuchone, won a Juno Award in the Best Aboriginal Album category in 1996.

Since 2011 the Adäka Cultural Festival, an annual multi-disciplinary arts and culture festival, has been held in Whitehorse. Celebrating First Nations arts and culture, with a specific focus on Yukon First Nations, in the Southern Tutchone language, means 'coming into the light'.

References

External links
 Yukon Native Language Center : Northern Tutchone
 Native Language Center : Southern Tutchone
 First Voices: Southern Tutchone
 Freelang Tutchone (Southern)-English dictionary
 OLAC resources in and about the Northern Tutchone language
 OLAC resources in and about the Southern Tutchone language

Northern Athabaskan languages
Indigenous languages of the North American Subarctic
First Nations languages in Canada
Critically endangered languages
Definitely endangered languages
Northern Tutchone
Southern Tutchone